Megachile astragali is a species of bee in the family Megachilidae. It was described by Mitchell in 1938.

References

Astragali
Insects described in 1938